Christian of Denmark may refer to:
Christian I of Denmark
Christian II of Denmark
Christian III of Denmark
Christian IV of Denmark
Christian V of Denmark
Christian VI of Denmark
Christian VII of Denmark
Christian VIII of Denmark
Christian IX of Denmark
Christian X of Denmark
Christian, Prince-Elect of Denmark (1603–1647), son of Christian IV
Prince Christian of Denmark (1675–1695), son of Christian V
Prince Christian of Denmark (b. 2005), the prospective Christian XI of Denmark